Francis Boeniger was an Argentine cinematographer. He worked on around seventy films during his career.

Selected filmography
 The Soul of the Accordion (1935)
 New Port     (1936)
 Three Men of the River (1943)
 The Prodigal Woman (1945)
 Wake Up to Life (1945)
 The Circus Cavalcade (1945)
 Lost Kisses (1945)
 Musical Romance (1947)
 From Man to Man (1949)
 The Earring (1951)
 The Voice of My City (1953)
 Love Never Dies (1955)

References

Bibliography
 Jorge Finkielman. The Film Industry in Argentina: An Illustrated Cultural History. McFarland, 2003.

External links

Year of birth unknown
Year of death unknown
Argentine cinematographers